Miaenia minuta is a species of longhorn beetle in the family Cerambycidae. It was described by Fisher in 1936.

References

Beetles described in 1936
Miaenia